Luntu Ntloko (born 19 October 1975) is a South African former field hockey player who competed in the 2000 Summer Olympics.

References

External links

1975 births
Living people
South African female field hockey players
Olympic field hockey players of South Africa
Field hockey players at the 2000 Summer Olympics
Competitors at the 2003 All-Africa Games
African Games competitors for South Africa